Rauðskinna (English: Red Skin), also known as The Book of Power, is a legendary book about black magic, alleged to have been buried with its author, the Bishop Gottskálk grimmi Nikulásson of Hólar. The subject of the book was to learn to master magic to such a degree as to control Satan. The book has been the subject of legend and folklore and desired by practitioners of galdr. One such legend is when the galdr master Loftur Þorsteinsson (Galdra-Loftur) tried to acquire it and allegedly lost his life because of it.

References

Other sources
Páll Eggert Ólason (1948) Íslenskar æviskrár (Hið íslenska bókmenntafélag) 

Grimoires
16th-century books
Witchcraft in Iceland